Love Songs is a 1986 compilation album by Willie Nelson.

Track listing
To All the Girls I've Loved Before (with Julio Iglesias)
Blue Skies
Let It Be Me
Tenderly
Harbor Lights
Mona Lisa
To Each His Own
Over the Rainbow
Seven Spanish Angels (with Ray Charles)
Georgia on My Mind
Bridge over Troubled Water
Without a Song
Unchained Melody
That Lucky Old Sun
In My Mother's Eyes
Always on My Mind

1986 compilation albums
Willie Nelson compilation albums
Columbia Records compilation albums